Huracán (English: Hurricane) is a Mexican telenovela produced by Rebecca Jones and Alejandro Camacho for Televisa in 1997.

On Monday, October 13, 1997, Canal de las Estrellas started broadcasting Huracán weekdays at 10:00pm, replacing El alma no tiene color. The last episode was broadcast on Friday, March 27, 1998 with La usurpadora replacing it the following day.

Angélica Rivera and Eduardo Palomo starred as protagonists, while Alexis Ayala, Maya Mishalska and the leading actor Jorge Russek starred as antagonists.

Plot 
The story takes place in the Mazatlán. Helena Robles is the illegitimate daughter of Alfonsina Robles and Fernan Vargaslugo, a rich man who, under the influence of his mother and sister, never had strength to recognize Helena as his daughter.

He married another woman and adopted a daughter, Larissa. Helena falls in love with Ulises Medina, a poor boy whose best friend is Raimundo Villareal, son of the impresario Nestor Villareal, the owner of the Nautilus companies. Nestor had intimate relations with the mother of Ulises when they were young, but he deceived her and now she hates all the Villareal family.

Ulises and Helena decide to escape together but their plan doesn't work and Ulises leaves alone, pursued by the police, because he robbed a ring from the true Helena's grandmother to give it to her as a present. Shortly after Helena leaves for Mexico. Nine years later Helena has become a famous biologist and Ulises is a sailor.

By chance they both return to Mazatlán at the same time, meet each other again and realize that their love is still alive. They start seeing each other again, but Raimundo and his sister Thelma are jealous because they are in love with Helena and Ulises. They try to separate the couple.

Cast 
 
Angélica Rivera as Helena Robles
Eduardo Palomo as Ulises Medina
Alexis Ayala as Raymundo Villarreal
Maya Mishalska as Thelma Villarreal de Vargaslugo
Jorge Russek as Don Néstor Villarreal
Alejandra Barros as Rocío Medina
Alex Ibarra as Santiago Villarreal
Eric del Castillo as Fernán Vargaslugo
Beatriz Aguirre as Doña Irasema Vargaslugo
Adriana Roel as Esperanza Ibarrola de Villarreal
Luis Couturier as Guillermo Medina
Sylvia Pasquel as Caridad Salvatierra de Medina
Aarón Hernán as Don Leonardo Robles
Norma Herrera as Alfonsina Taviani de Robles
Pilar Pellicer as Ada Vargaslugo
Ivette Proal as Larissa Vargaslugo
Héctor Cruz Lara as Lobato Ramírez Villarreal
Fernando Balzaretti as Ezequiel Vargaslugo
Ludwika Paleta as Norma Vargaslugo
Oscar Uriel as Eugenio Vargaslugo
Marcela Páez as Maribel Solares de Medina
Jesús Arriaga as Damián Medina
Oscar Morelli as Don Mariano Medina
Alejandra Procuna as Deyanira
Gabriela Platas as Karina Robles
Roberto D'Amico as José Jorge García
Virginia Gutiérrez as Mother Brígida Ibarrola
Sherlyn as Daniela Vargaslugo Villarreal
Oscar Servin as Father Elías
Alejandra Morales as Cynthia
Manuel Benítez as Comandante Gregorio Quijano
Esteban Franco as Jacinto
Ignacio Guadalupe as Conrado
Jorge Pais as Dr. Álvaro Carrasco
Dulce María as Rocío Medina (child)
Eric Sánchez as Eugenio Vargaslugo (child)
Daniel Habif as Santiago Villarreal (child)
Alfredo Alfonso as Dr. Mario Luna
Elena Ballesteros as Ramona
Graciela Bernardos as Milagros
Luis Bernardos as Artemio Hernández
Guadalupe Bolaños as Mother Carmela
Ernesto Bretón as Eligio
Zayda Castellón as Dora López
Javier Chimaldi as Lino
Constantino Costas as Walter Pereira
Georgina del Rincón as Socorro
Sheryl Mackay as Dolores
Luis Guillermo Martell as Pepe
Adán Martínez Cosain as Héctor
Sara Montes as Ifigenia
Rubén Morales as Froilán
Fernando Morín as Narciso
Gustavo Negrete as Lic. Félix
Lisette Sáez as Ana
Rocío Yaber as Inmaculada
Rodolfo Jiménez as Ricardo

Awards

References

External links

1997 telenovelas
Mexican telenovelas
1997 Mexican television series debuts
1998 Mexican television series endings
Spanish-language telenovelas
Television shows set in Mexico City
Televisa telenovelas